Combining Diacritical Marks Supplement is a Unicode block containing combining characters for the Uralic Phonetic Alphabet, Medievalist notations, and German dialectology (Teuthonista). It is an extension of the diacritic characters found in the Combining Diacritical Marks block.

Block

History
The following Unicode-related documents record the purpose and process of defining specific characters in the Combining Diacritical Marks Supplement block:

References 

Unicode blocks